The Berberidaceae are a family of 18 genera of flowering plants commonly called the barberry family. This family is in the order Ranunculales. The family contains about 700 known species, of which the majority are in Berberis. The species include trees, shrubs and perennial herbaceous plants.

General

The APG IV system of 2016 recognises the family and places it in the order Ranunculales in the clade eudicots.

In some older treatments of the family, Berberidaceae only included four genera (Berberis, Epimedium, Mahonia, Vancouveria), with the other genera treated in separate families, Leonticaceae (Bongardia, Caulophyllum, Gymnospermium, Leontice), Nandinaceae (Nandina), and Podophyllaceae (Achlys, Diphylleia, Dysosma, Jeffersonia, Podophyllum, Ranzania, Sinopodophyllum).

Mahonia is very closely related to Berberis, and included in it by many botanists. However, recent DNA-based phylogenetic research has reinstated Mahonia, though with a handful of species transferred into the newly described genera Alloberberis (formerly Mahonia section Horridae) and Moranothamnus (formerly Mahonia claireae). Species of Mahonia and Berberis can be hybridised, with the hybrids being classified in the genus × Mahoberberis.

Diphyllaea is closely related to or perhaps embedded within Podophyllum. Instead of the current trend to subdivide Podophyllum into three genera (Podophyllum, plus Dysosma and Sinopodophyllum), inclusion of Diphyllaea in a larger Podophyllum is equally warranted.

Gallery

References

External links 
 
 Berberidaceae, Leonticaceae, Nandinaceae, Podophyllaceae in L. Watson and M.J. Dallwitz (1992 onwards), The families of flowering plants.
 Berberidaceae links 
 Chilean Berberidaceae, by Chileflora

 
Eudicot families
Flora of Nepal